Edgar Kupfer-Koberwitz, 24 April 1906 – 7 July 1991) was a German journalist, poet and prisoner in the Dachau concentration camp. He was the author of the Dachau Diaries, in which he describes the events in the concentration camp, the SS Camp and the prisoner society.

Early life 
He was born Edgar Kupfer in 1906, the son of an estate manager. He first worked in agriculture and later as an office worker after completing secondary school. He also wrote poetry and newspaper articles on the side. He later took the pen name  Kupfer-Koberwitz .

After Adolf Hitler's rise to power he fled to Paris in 1934, where he got a job as a hand weaver. From 1937 he worked for a travel company on the Italian island of Ischia. In September 1940 he was expelled from Italy to Innsbruck for disparaging the Nazi regime and Italian fascism.

Dachau Diaries
On 11 November 1940 Kupfer-Koberwitz was committed to Dachau concentration camp by the Gestapo and from November 1942 was a clerk in a Dachau satellite camp that provided slave labor for the  Präzifix Screw Factory , an armaments industry. During this time, at risk to his life, from 20 November 1942 to 2 May 1945 he wrote the manuscript known as the Dachau Diaries, which would ultimately run to 1800 pages.  While writing it within the camp, he hid it in various locations and finally buried it in October 1944, wrapped in layers of aluminum, fabric and oil cloth to help preserve it.

Kupfer-Koberwitz led American forces to the location of his diaries a week after they had liberated the Dachau camp on 29 April 1945.  The diary, although damp, had largely survived. Two years later it would be used as evidence during the Nuremberg Trials.

Post-war

In the course of the liberation of Dachau he was released at the end of April 1945.

After the liberation he lived in the USA until the end of the 1950s, and from 1960 on Sardinia in the village San Teodoro. In 1986 he returned to Germany , first living with friends and finally in an anthroposophical nursing home near Stuttgart.

Kupfer-Koberwitz was the author of several books. The Dachau Diaries are now kept at the University of Chicago Library. In addition to publications on the Dachau concentration camp and the island of Ischia, in 1947, as a staunch vegan, he wrote Die Tierbrüder - a reflection on ethical life, a passionate appeal against indifferent and cruel treatment of animals.
He believed that he had "suffered so much myself that I can feel other creatures' suffering by virtue of my own".  He further wrote, "I believe as long as man tortures and kills animals, he will torture and kill humans as well—and wars will be waged—for killing must be practiced and learned on a small scale".

Works (selection) 
  Life - Hell! , Stuttgart 1931
  Die Tierbrüder , Man-Verlag, Augsburg 1947
  Chain of Days: Poems from Dachau , Hatje, Stuttgart 1947
  The forgotten island: A book about the volcanic island of Ischia , Wolff, Flensburg 1948
  The powerful and the helpless: As prisoners in Dachau , Vorwerk, Stuttgart (vol. 1.  How it began  1957, vol. 2.  How it ended  1960)
  Dachau diaries: The records of the prisoner 24814 , Kindler, Munich 1997, .

References

External links 
 Literature by and about Edgar Kupfer-Koberwitz in the German National Library catalogue
 Reading by Barbara Distel:  Dachauer Tagebücher. The records of prisoner 24814 Edgar Koberwitz  on www.thomasneumann.info; accessed: April 14, 2019 
  Edgar Kupfer-Koberwitz - bequests  on Literaturportal Bayern 
 Elke Schubert: Alltag in the camp. The Dachau diary of the prisoner Edgar Kupfer-Koberwitz . In: Die Zeit online from 4 July 1997 
 Björn Berg: "History of a Captivity. Edgar Kupfer-Koberwitz: Dachauer diaries. The records of inmate 24814 '' (Review) 
  About the author Edgar Kupfer-Koberwitz  on http://www.veggiswelt.de 
  Freiheit für Tiere  (PDF file; 748 kB), issue 2/2011, p. 52f.

Historians of the Holocaust in Germany
Dachau concentration camp survivors
Emigrants from Nazi Germany
German animal rights scholars
German diarists
German-language writers
German male poets
Silesian-German people
1906 births
1991 deaths
20th-century German male writers
20th-century German non-fiction writers
German political journalists
German male journalists
20th-century German journalists
20th-century diarists